The president of Vanuatu is the head of state of Vanuatu. The president is elected for a five-year term by an electoral college consisting of Parliament and the presidents of the regional councils. 

The president's role is mostly ceremonial. The Constitution grants the president the ability to appoint the chief justice of the Supreme Court of Vanuatu, and three other justices.

In case of vacancy, the speaker of the Parliament will be the acting president of Vanuatu. 

From 1906 to 1980 the resident commissioners of the New Hebrides were British and French colonial officials. From 1887 to 1906 the New Hebrides was led by Anglo-French joint naval commissioners.

The current president is Nikenike Vurobaravu, since 23 July 2022.

List of presidents

See also
 Politics of Vanuatu
 Prime Minister of Vanuatu
 List of resident commissioners of the New Hebrides

References 

 
Vanuatu
Government of Vanuatu
Vanuatuan politicians
1980 establishments in Vanuatu
Vanuatu politics-related lists